Muchundi Mosque (Malayalam: മുച്ചുന്തിപ്പള്ളി Muccunti Palli, formerly Muchiyan/Machinde/Muchandi Palli) is a mosque located at Kuttichira, within in the city of Kozhikode (Calicut) in the Indian state of Kerala. Kuttichira is the medieval Muslim quarter in the city of Calicut. It is situated south of Mishkal Mosque, Kuttichira Tank and the Kuttichira Jum'ah Masjid. The mosque does not conduct the jum'ah prayers – the special noon service on Friday that all adult, male, free Muslims are obliged to attend.

The current mosque structure is built in Kerala architectural style, without minarets, domes or arches. Roof of the mosque contains elaborate calligraphy of the Qur'anic verses, decorated with carved flowers on the side. It is reasonable to assume that the foundations must have supported one of the oldest mosques in Kozhikode.

Muchundi Mosque holds a granite inscription datable to c. 13th century AD. The inscription is the only surviving document recording endowment by a Hindu king (the Zamorin of Calicut) to the Muslims of Kerala. As per the inscription, the mosque was established by certain Shahab al-din Raihan. Historians tentatively assume that "Muchiyan" might be the Old Malayalam name given to Raihan by the people of Kozhikode. Raihan must have been a wealthy Arab merchant settled at Kozhikode. A medieval Muslim aristocratic house called "Muchintakam" is situated close to the mosque. A traditional jaram – a mausoleum/tomb – called "Muchiyante Jaram" is also found near the mosque. The Zamorins of Calicut remained the protectors of the mosque throughout the medieval times. The salary of the qadi of the mosque was paid by from Kozhikode.

The mosque is sometimes associated with Shaikh Zain-ud-Din Makhdum II, the 16th century polymath, and the famous author of Tuhafat al-Mujahidin.

Muchundi Mosque Inscription 
 
William Logan, former Collector and Magistrate of Malabar District, makes a reference to the Muchundi Inscription in his famous manual Malabar (1887). The mosque was called "Machchinde Mosque" by W. Logan. The inscription was eventually deciphered by historians M. G. S. Narayanan, M. R. Raghava Warrier and Kunhu Muhammed.

The highly damaged, worn and fragmentary donative inscription is engraved on a granite stone slab (slab is seen as fixed on the wall at Mosque Muchundi). The inscription is undated, but can be positioned on paleographic grounds to the c. 13th century AD. The content is divided on functional grounds between Old Malayalam and Arabic. The concluding portion is in Arabic, while the functional portion recording the specific details of the endowment is in Old Malayalam. The script of the Old Malayalam portion is Vattezhuthu, a type of medieval script closely related to modern Malayalam and Tamil. The letters are not carved into the stone surface – like the usual Kodungallur Chera style – but are raised on the stone in imitation of the standard practice in Islamic inscriptions.

Text
The text is divided into two distinct halves. First half has 32 very short Vattezhuthu lines in Old Malayalam. It describes the assignment of revenues accruing from certain lands for the expenditure of Muchundi Mosque. The inscription mentions two local place names, "Kunnamangalam" and "Pulikkizhu".

As per M. G. S. Narayanan, the old Malayalam (Vatteluttu) portion can be read as,

"This is an order of Punturakkon, this is to...by the Officer - in - Attendance (Kettu Viliyan). He ordered that daily expenses of one nazhi [of rice should be] granted to the Muchiyan's Mosque...He ordered that from Kunnamangalam...Pulikkizhu...to the Mosque...future also...Twelve para..."

The Arabic portion, the second half, starts with the opening prayer from Qur'an. It says that certain Shahab al-din Raihan purchased the piece of land and constructed thereon the mosque, and made provision for its imam and mua'dhdhin.

As per Z. A. Desai, the Arabic portion can be read as,

"Shahab al-din Raihan was a freed slave (atiq) of the late Mas'ud, purchased ...(?)... out of his own money, land from its owner and constructed thereon this mosque and well and made [provision] for its imam and mua'dhdhin by constructing a big edifice"

Traveller Ibn Batutah (14th century AD) had indicated that certain Shihab-ud-Din Khasaruni was a Port Officer (Shah Bandar) of the Samoothir of Kozhikode.

See also 
 Mishkal Mosque

References 

Mosques in Kerala
Buildings and structures in Kozhikode
13th-century mosques
Religious buildings and structures in Kozhikode district